The China Women's Sevens was first played in 2013 as part of the (then) IRB Women's Sevens World Series. The tournament is played at the University Town Stadium in Guangzhou.

Results

2013
30–31 March 2013

Group A

 29-0 
 47-0 
 53-0 
 12-12 
 20-5 
 24-0 

Group B

 26-5 
 33-5 
 12-7 
 52-5 
 10-20 
 0-33 

Plate Semi Finals (5th-8th)
Netherlands 22-0 Brazil
Ireland 15-14 Australia

7th/8th Match 
Brazil 5-7 Australia

Plate final: 5th/6th Match 
Netherlands 10-14 Ireland

Group C

 24-5 
 15-0 
 24-10 
 21-12 
 19-0 
 15-10 

Bowl Semi Finals (9th-12th)
China 57-0 Tunisia
Fiji 5-12 Japan

11th/12th Match 
Fiji 19-0 Tunisia

Bowl final:9th/10th Match 
China 10-14 Japan

Quarter-finals (1st-8th)
New Zealand 31-5 Ireland
Australia 14-17 United States
England 19-12 Netherlands
Canada 33-0 Brazil

Cup Semi Finals (1st-4th)
England 19-0 Canada
New Zealand 24-12 United States

3rd/4th place
Canada 5-17 United States

Cup Final: 1st/2nd place
England 5-19 New Zealand

2014
5–6 April 2014

Group A

 33-0 
 12-7 
 50-0 
 12-7 
 26-5 
 22-17 

Group B

 50-0 
 12-15 
 24-5 
 21-19 
 10-15 
 7-36 

Plate Semi Finals (5th-8th)
France 10-5 Russia
Spain 0-26 England

7th/8th Match 
Russia 0-17 Spain

Plate final: 5th/6th Match 
France 0-19 England

Group C

 35-7 
 12-7 
 19-7 
 19-10 
 12-12 
 12-14 

Bowl Semi Finals (9th-12th)
Brazil 0-15 Ireland
United States 7-17 China

11th/12th Match 
Brazil 0-31 United States

Bowl final:9th/10th Match 
Ireland 17-7 China

Quarter-finals (1st-8th)
New Zealand 42-7 France
Russia 7-12 Fiji
Australia 12-5 Spain
Canada 19-10 England

Cup Semi Finals (1st-4th)
New Zealand 26-0 Fiji
Australia 5-0 Canada

3rd/4th place
Fiji 5-26 Canada

Cup Final: 1st/2nd place
New Zealand 26-12 Australia

See also
 World Rugby Women's Sevens Series
 China Sevens (Men's)

References

 
World Rugby Women's Sevens Series tournaments
International rugby union competitions hosted by China
Sports competitions in Guangzhou
Rugby sevens competitions in Asia
Women's rugby union competitions in Asia
Women's rugby union competitions for national teams
2013 establishments in China